Anna Kournikova's Smash Court Tennis, known in Japan as , is a tennis video game developed by Namco for the PlayStation. It is the second title in Namco's Smash Court series of games. The game was released in Japan in November 1998 and was later released in Europe in 1999, featuring the likeness of professional tennis player Anna Kournikova.

Gameplay
Anna Kournikova's Smash Court Tennis is a simple tennis game which can be played with up to four players. The game features various modes such as a training mode, Street Tennis, which is played on street courts, and Smash Tennis, in which players fight against each other using explosive tennis balls. Along with various tennis characters, players can unlock characters from various Namco games, including Richard Miller and Sherudo Garo from Time Crisis, Heihachi Mishima, Yoshimitsu and Eddy Gordo from Tekken 3, Pac-Man and Reiko Nagase from Ridge Racer Type 4.

Reception

References

1998 video games
Kournikova, Anna
Kournikova, Anna
Namco games
PlayStation (console) games
PlayStation (console)-only games
Tennis video games
Kournikova, Anna
Video games featuring female protagonists
Video games developed in Japan